Solitaire is a one-act ballet created by Kenneth MacMillan in 1956 for the Sadler's Wells Theatre Ballet (later the Royal Ballet), London. The music is by Malcolm Arnold: his two sets of English Dances, with two new dances specially composed by Arnold, a sarabande and a polka. The polka was created for New Zealand dancer Sara Neil.

The first performance was at Sadler's Wells Theatre, London on 7 June 1956. The principal character, called The Girl, was danced by Margaret Hill.

Original cast
 Margaret Hill, The Girl
 Sara Neil
 Donald Britton
 Michael Boulton
 Donald MacLeary

Notes

Ballets by Kenneth MacMillan
1956 ballet premieres